Qeshlaq-e Qarah Takanlu Amrollah (also Romanized as Qeshlāq-e Qarah Takānlū Amrollah) is a village in Qeshlaq-e Gharbi Rural District, Aslan Duz District, Parsabad County, Ardabil Province, Iran. At the 2006 census, its population was 187, in 32 families.

References 

Towns and villages in Parsabad County